Ubuntu Cola is a soft drink certified by The Fairtrade Foundation. Made with Fairtrade sugar from Malawi and Zambia, Ubuntu Cola is the first UK cola to be Fairtrade certified. It is available for sale in the United Kingdom, Hungary, Sweden, Norway, Denmark, Finland, Ireland, The Netherlands, Belgium, France, Greece, Italy, Switzerland, Poland, Luxembourg and online.

It is available in 330 ml cans, 500 ml PET plastic bottles, and 275 ml glass bottles.

Name
The cola is named after the African philosophy of Ubuntu, which means humanity or fellow feeling; kindness, There is no connection between the cola and the Ubuntu open-source operating system (also named after the philosophy). Moreover, Ubuntu Cola is not an open-source cola.

Fairtrade
Ubuntu Cola's sugar is sourced from Fairtrade worker cooperatives in Kasinthula, Malawi and Kaleya, Zambia. Farmers who are members of the Fairtrade cooperative at Kasinthula receive an income of $4 a day, which is six times the national average income.

References

Cola brands
Fair trade brands